The 2015–16 season was Port Vale's 104th season of football in the English Football League, and third successive season in League One. It was manager Rob Page's first full season in management. The season covers the period from 1 July 2015 through to 30 June 2016.

Chairman Norman Smurthwaite announced a cut in the wage bill and reduced contract offers for many out-of-contract players, which led to Mark Marshall, Ben Williamson and top-scorer Tom Pope leaving the club on free transfers after rejecting contract offers. A new youth policy was unveiled, and eight free agents, five youth team players and two loan players were signed at the start of the campaign. They made an encouraging start to the campaign, with new names Enoch Andoh and Jak Alnwick impressing, beating Championship side Burnley in the League Cup before going out on penalties to Premier League club West Bromwich Albion. However a poor defeat in the Second Round of the FA Cup to League Two side Exeter City cost the club a lucrative Third Round tie with Liverpool and prompted Smurthwaite to officially put the club up for sale.

Vale remained positioned between 13th and 8th from November onwards, and realistic hopes of a play-off position were ended after a run of just one point from four games from 19 March. They ended this run of poor form by relegating local rivals Crewe Alexandra on 2 April. They were reliant on loan striker Uche Ikpeazu for goals early in the campaign, before Louis Dodds and A-Jay Leitch-Smith in particular found scoring form in the latter half of the season.

Overview

League One
Five youth team players were given professional contracts for the 2015–16 season: defender Lewis Bergin, midfielders Chekaine Steele, Billy Reeves and Omar Haughton, and striker Jonathon Kapend. Manager Rob Page signed a new two-year contract in May 2015. However he needed to avoid a poor start to the season as chairman Norman Smurthwaite warned he was prepared to make "ruthless decisions" if the club were struggling by September. The first signings of the season were powerful former loanee defender Remie Streete from Newcastle United, and former Norwich City youth player Sam Kelly. Midfielder Sam Foley also joined the "Valiants" on a two-year contract, choosing to leave relegated Yeovil Town just after picking up Yeovil's Player of the Year award. Page further strengthened the defence and midfield by signing Walsall right-back Ben Purkiss and Crewe Alexandra defensive midfielder Anthony Grant. Page needed to find a cost-effective forward with the club both short on strikers following the departure of Tom Pope and Ben Williamson and with little funds available due to a large cut to the wage bill, and so brought in young Watford striker Uche Ikpeazu on loan, having been impressed by Ikpeazu's performances for Crewe last season. Another former Crewe favourite, A-Jay Leitch-Smith, was also signed after impressing Page during pre-season. The eighth and final summer signing was Ryan Inniss, who was confirmed as joining on a season long loan from Crystal Palace after being linked with a return to Vale Park for many weeks. On 6 August, Vale signed goalkeeper Jak Alnwick on a short-term deal; he was signed to compete with Sam Johnson for a first team place as Chris Neal was out injured at the start of the season.

The season opened with the derby against Crewe Alexandra at Gresty Road, and the game ended 0–0 with eight players making their debuts for Vale; Crewe boss Steve Davis admitted Vale were the better team and had man of the match goalkeeper Ben Garratt to thank for the clean sheet. Two days later a third former Newcastle United Academy graduate arrived in striker JJ Hooper, who had scored 20 goals in 29 games the previous season for Havant & Waterlooville. The unbeaten start continued with a 1–1 draw with Gillingham, Louis Dodds scoring the equalising goal to secure the point. An injury-time penalty from Sam Foley then rescued a point away at Swindon Town as Vale twice came from behind against an attractive Swindon side; the penalty was awarded in bizarre circumstances as Jordan Williams handled the ball from a corner to try and stop the game after seeing a teammate lying injured on the pitch. Vale then cruised to a comfortable 3–0 home victory over Doncaster Rovers despite Foley missing a penalty early in the game. Yet another player arrived in the form of central midfielder Jak McCourt, signed on a one-month loan from Leicester City. The unbeaten start to the season came to an end at Bradford City when Devante Cole scored the only goal of the game four minutes into stoppage time.

Vale let slip a two-goal lead over Wigan Athletic on 12 September, but Ikpeazu managed to claim all three points for Vale after Wigan's equalising goalscorer Leon Barnett was sent off for bringing down Andoh. Millwall were the next visitors to Vale Park, and like Wigan had been relegated from the Championship the previous season, but unlike Wigan managed to beat the Vale 2–0 with a professional performance. Vale then travelled to Bury and slipped to a 1–0 defeat in a poor game that was decided by a set-piece. Vale came from behind at Fleetwood Town to win 2–1 after Page substituted top-scorer Ikpeazu for Colin Daniel, who went on to score the equalising goal. The situation was reversed at home to Oldham Athletic, Ikpeazu coming off the bench to secure a point against the division's away draw specialists, though Page again bemoaned his team's habit of conceding form set pieces.

Vale put in a highly impressive performance to defeat Sheffield United 2–1 and climb to within one point of the play-off places. They failed to build on the result however, falling to a 1–0 loss at Southend United; Phil Brown said the Southend performance was the best he had seen as Southend manager. The story before the Peterborough United game was that Jak Alnwick was to line up against his elder brother Ben Alnwick, though the headlines after the game focused on Vale's penalty takers, as Michael O'Connor marked his return from injury by missing a penalty and central midfield partner Foley later missed a second penalty in the game to squander two points in what ended as a 1–1 draw. Vale then had a tough mid-week game at Colchester United, and lost 2–1 after suffering two injuries in the first half. More significantly Andoh suffered damage to his anterior cruciate ligament and was ruled out for the rest of the season. Ikpeazu was sent off 25 minutes into Vale's trip to high-flying Burton Albion, but ironically it was only after the hosts also went down to ten men late into the game that Vale conceded two goals to lose 2–0. Vale ended a poor October with a 2–0 home victory over Shrewsbury Town.

On 14 November, Vale picked up all three points at Oakwell after a 2–1 victory over Barnsley. Less than 40 hours after their FA Cup first round victory, Vale then had a home fixture against Chesterfield on a snow covered pitch, but managed to put in a high quality performance and claim a 3–2 win. Their home game against Blackpool was the players' third game in five days, but they showed no signs of fatigue as two late goals secured a 2–0 victory. They failed to end the month unbeaten however as they fell to a 2–1 defeat at Rochdale; after the game Page said he was "gobsmacked" by the referee's key decisions to award Rochdale a penalty when Carl Dickinson had "definitely taken the ball", to deny Vale a penalty after Ikpeazu was "absolutely poleaxed" in the penalty box, and to send Dickinson off when he "hasn't touched the lad at all and the lad goes down like he has been shot." Page was nominated for the League One Manager of the Month award.

Despite revelations off-the-pitch and a disappointing FA Cup exit, Vale kept their league form steady on 12 December with a 1–1 home draw with Scunthorpe United. However they then came away from a trip to high-flying Walsall with a 2–0 defeat in a game that typified the team's unsuccessful negative tactics away from home. Captain Carl Dickinson defended the team's record however, stating that negative fans who booed should "shut up and get behind the team". A trip to the Ricoh Arena on boxing day to face Coventry City seemed to be heading for a goalless draw until Coventry took the lead ten minutes from full-time, leaving Page to rue his team's missed opportunities in the first half. Vale ended the year with a 1–0 home win over Bury, maintaining their excellent form at Vale Park.

A waterlogged pitch meant Vale had to wait until a trip to Blackpool on 9 January to open the year, and Vale managed to continue their good form with a hard-earned 1–0 victory, Leitch-Smith the goalscorer. Their away form remained poor however, as they were well beaten at Millwall on 17 January. The team were then booed off after surrendering a 1–0 lead over ten man Bradford to draw 1–1. Page then entered the transfer market, bringing in Jamaica international striker Theo Robinson and taking Cardiff City winger Matty Kennedy on a one-month loan (which was later extended by two months). Kennedy started the next game, as Leitch-Smith scored both of Vale's goals in a 2–1 win over Doncaster Rovers. However Vale ended the month with a 3–0 defeat at Wigan following a first half red card for Ryan McGivern.

Vale began February just a point outside the play-offs after recording what Page described as an "ugly" 1–0 win over Swindon. Vale then outplayed Coventry, but needed a sensational goal from Sam Kelly to win a point and a 1–1 draw. Vale then rounded off a series of three successive home games with a 0–0 draw with Fleetwood. Injury to Alnwick meant that Neal was recalled from his loan spell at Doncaster Rovers for the trip to Sheffield United, which ended in a 1–0 defeat from a Billy Sharp goal. They ended the month with an impressive 3–1 home win over Southend to remain in touch with the play-off places.

Struggling Oldham held Vale to a 1–1 draw on 1 March, having lost their slender lead to a disputed penalty. A 2–0 home win over bottom-club Colchester kept the Vale in touch of the play-offs. The season appeared to be petering out as Vale trailed by 2–0 at half-time at Peterborough, but they turned the game around completely in the second half to claim a 3–2 victory. Page praised the character of his players after revealing eight players had paid to stay in a local hotel the night before to save travelling on the day. However the next game saw Page apologizing to the fans after league leaders Burton ended Vale's 14-game unbeaten league run at home with a 4–0 win. Vale were heading for a 1–0 victory over Shrewsbury when a late error from Alnwick allowed Sullay Kaikai's long-distance strike to become an equalizing goal. A 1–0 home defeat to play-off chasing Barnsley then ended any realistic hopes of a play-off place for the Vale.

On 2 April, Port Vale collapsed away at Chesterfield, losing a convincing 1–0 half-time lead to lose 4–2; Page described the performance as "embarrassing" and "not acceptable". Seven days later Vale went on to relegate nearby Crewe Alexandra with a comfortable 3–0 home victory, Dodds scoring a brace and Hooper claiming one goal. Vale went on to record a 2–0 win at sixth-place Gillingham using a 3–5–2 formation with McGivern, Streete, and Richard Duffy operating as central defenders. The winning run continued with a comfortable 4–1 victory over Rochdale, before coming to an end with a 1–0 defeat at Scunthorpe. Walsall inflicted a heavy 5–0 on Vale on the final game of the season.

Page offered new contracts to 13 out-of-contract players, and opted to release nine players: Lewis Bergin, Achille Campion, Colin Daniel, Omar Haughton (who was later re-signed after Page departed), Jonathon Kapend, Ryan McGivern, Chris Neal, Chekaine Steele, and Theo Robinson. However Page himself would not stay to see any of these contracts signed, as he left the club to take charge at newly promoted Northampton Town. The first player to leave the club after rejecting a contract was Louis Dodds, who joined league rivals Shrewsbury Town. He was quickly followed by Richard Duffy, who dropped down two divisions to join National League club Eastleigh. Star midfielder Michael O'Connor, top-scorer A-Jay Leitch-Smith, and club captain Carl Dickinson also confirmed that they would be leaving the club after rejecting the club's new contract offer. The last to leave was Enoch Andoh, who could not agree terms with the club despite protracted negotiations.

Finances & ownership issues
Chairman Norman Smurthwaite stated that due to falling gate figures the club's wage bill would be cut for the 2015–16 season, meaning a severely reduced contract offer for star striker Tom Pope, who chose to leave the club. In a statement released in March 2017, Smurthwaite stated that on 10 November 2015 he was approached by an American hedge fund consortium who were looking to buy the club. He further stated that a local business also approached the club secretary to purchase the club behind Smurthwaite's back. Following the club's FA Cup exit Smurthwaite officially put the club up for sale, saying that he felt "humiliated, ashamed and embarrassed" after witnessing the team's performance. He set an asking price of £4.25 million, stating "I have never lost money on a transaction in my adult life and I am not starting now". He also stated that plans to sign a striker in the January transfer window would be scrapped. He continued to reveal that he had been physically assaulted by three Vale supporters in April 2014, though Staffordshire Police could find no record of Smurthwaite's complaint. He also admitted that he had been planning on buying Torquay United before being told by the Football League that he would not be allowed to own two clubs. He further claimed that he had considered appointing Jimmy Floyd Hasselbaink as manager in September 2014, but decided against it partly because he believed that a racist minority of the club's supporters would make appointing a black manager a bad idea.

Smurthwaite signed an exclusivity deal with a local company in February 2016. He said that if the club were not sold than next season's budget would be slashed by £800,000 and the playing squad would be reduced; Page said that Smurthwaite's comments were "unwelcome". Ben Purkiss admitted that Smurthwaite's threat to cut player's wages by 40% had a destabilising effect on the squad. The exclusivity agreement ended in early March, with the club back on general sale. Smurthwaite said this was because the company had significantly reduced their offer and admitted that they needed to find further finances to conclude the deal. A consortium from Boston, USA then signed an exclusivity deal on 14 March. Smurthwaite ended the negotiations after finding that the investors had no working capital. Port Vale owed Norman Smurthwaite £3 million as a director's loan at the end of June 2016.

Cup competitions
Vale's first opponents in the FA Cup were Maidenhead United of the National League South, who came back from Byron Moore's first half opener to bring about a replay after a stoppage time equaliser. An upset seemed on the cards in the replay when Maidenhead took the lead, but Vale gradually took control of the game and A-Jay Leitch-Smith scored a brace in an eventual 3–1 victory. Smurthwaite was rumoured to have planned to sack Page live on BT Sport if the club lost the game, though he dismissed the rumour as untrue. A trip to mid-table League Two side Exeter City awaited in the second Round, and an all-round "hugely disappointing performance" resulted in a 2–0 defeat. After the game Smurthwaite and Page had a heated confrontation on the pitch, leading to speculation on the manager's future. Had Vale beaten Exeter then they would have had a lucrative home tie with Liverpool in the Third Round.

In the League Cup First Round Vale hosted Burnley, who had been relegated from the Premier League the previous season; Byron Moore scored the only goal of the game on 82 minutes. The Second Round draw took them to Premier League side West Bromwich Albion, and Vale held Tony Pulis's side to a 0–0 draw until the end of extra-time before losing the penalty shoot-out.

Vale hosted League Two side Carlisle United in the First Round of the Football League Trophy, and Page named the strongest side at his disposal whilst "Blues" boss Keith Curle left top-scorer Jabo Ibehre on the bench; Uche Ikpeazu scored the only goal of the game as a Vale booked their place in the Second Round. Despite naming a strong team at home to struggling Blackpool, who made eight changes, Page was angered with the team for their performance as they crashed out at the Second round with a 2–1 defeat.

Results

Pre-season

League One

League table

Results by matchday

Matches

FA Cup

League Cup

Football League Trophy

Staffordshire Senior Cup
Port Vale and Stoke City field reserve teams for the competition, and player statistics are not recorded in the 'squad statistics' section listed below.

Squad statistics

Appearances and goals

Top scorers

Disciplinary record

Sourced from Soccerway.

Awards

Transfers

Transfers in

Transfers out

Loans in

Loans out

References
Specific

Port Vale F.C. seasons
Port Vale